Paraglaciecola aestuariivivens is a Gram-negative and aerobic bacterium from the genus of Paraglaciecola which has been isolated from tidal flat sediments from Jindo in Korea.

References

Bacteria described in 2017
Alteromonadales